The 2022–23 Pakistan Cup was a List A cricket competition that took place in Pakistan from 10 December 2022 to 3 January 2023. Balochistan were the defending champions.

Central Punjab won the competition, defeating Balochistan by 50 runs in the final.

Venues
The group stage matches were hosted in three different venues in Karachi, with SBP Sports Complex hosting the semi-finals and the final.

Points table

 Advanced to the Semi-finals

Fixtures

Group stage

Round 1

Round 2

Round 3

Round 4

Round 5

Round 6

Round 7

Round 8

Round 9

Round 10

Knockout stage

Bracket

Semi-finals

Final

References

External links
 Series home at PCB
 Series home at ESPN Cricinfo

2022 in Pakistani cricket
2022–23
Domestic cricket competitions in 2022–23
December 2022 events in Pakistan